Bokat is a village in the Kuhenjan section of Sarvestan city in Fars province of Iran.

Bokat is a village in Kuhenjan Rural District, Kuhenjan District, Sarvestan County, Fars Province, Iran. At the 2006 census, its population was 664, in 164 families.

References 

Populated places in Sarvestan County